Clement Springer is a Saint Lucian folk musician and folklorist, leader of a group called The Helenites.  He is also a leader of the Saint Lucia Cultural Organization.

References

Nouvelle Nous

Folklorists
Saint Lucian musicians
Living people
Year of birth missing (living people)
Place of birth missing (living people)